The United States Senate Special Committee on Aging was initially established in 1961 as a temporary committee; it became a permanent Senate committee in 1977. As a special committee, it has no legislative authority, but it studies issues related to older Americans, particularly Medicare and Social Security.

Prior to the passage of Medicare, the committee was studying health care insurance coverage for elderly American citizens. The committee conducts oversight of the Medicare program, Social Security and the Older Americans Act. Some of the issues that have been examined by the committee include unacceptable conditions in nursing homes, protection from age discrimination, and pricing practices for prescription drugs.

Members, 118th Congress

Historical rosters

115th Congress

116th Congress

117th Congress

Chairperson

Patrick V. McNamara (D-MI), 1961–1963
George Smathers (D-FL), 1963–1967
Harrison A. Williams (D-NJ), 1967–1971
Frank Church (D-ID), 1971–1979
Lawton Chiles (D-FL) 1979–1981
H. John Heinz III (R-PA), 1981–1987
John Melcher (D-MT), 1987–1989
David Pryor (D-AR), 1989–1995
William Cohen (R-ME), 1995–1997
Charles Grassley (R-IA), 1997–2001
John Breaux (D-LA), 2001
Larry Craig (R-ID), 2001
John Breaux (D-LA), 2001–2003
Larry Craig (R-ID), 2003–2005
Gordon Smith (R-OR), 2005–2007
Herb Kohl (D-WI), 2007–2013
Bill Nelson (D-FL), 2013–2015
Susan Collins (R-ME), 2015–2021
Bob Casey Jr. (D-PA), 2021–present

See also
List of current United States Senate committees

References

External links
Committee website

Aging
United States elder law
1961 establishments in Washington, D.C.

Parliamentary committees on Healthcare